Matti Oskar Helenius-Seppälä (27 June 1870, Pälkäne – 18 October 1920) was a Finnish social scientist, temperance movement activist and politician. He was a member of the Parliament of Finland from 1908 to 1909, from 1911 to 1914, in 1917 and from 1919 to 1920, representing the Christian Workers' Union of Finland (SKrTL). He was married to the temperance activist and social worker, Alli Trygg-Helenius.

He is buried in the Hietaniemi Cemetery in Helsinki.

References

External links
 

1870 births
1920 deaths
People from Pälkäne
People from Häme Province (Grand Duchy of Finland)
Christian Workers' Union of Finland politicians
Members of the Parliament of Finland (1908–09)
Members of the Parliament of Finland (1911–13)
Members of the Parliament of Finland (1916–17)
Members of the Parliament of Finland (1919–22)
University of Helsinki alumni
Burials at Hietaniemi Cemetery
Finnish temperance activists